Edinburgh Street Tramways operated a horse-drawn tramway service in Edinburgh between 1871 and 1896, and Leith between 1871 and 1904.

History

Services started on 6 November 1871 from Haymarket in Edinburgh to Bernard Street in Leith.

Closure

On 9 December 1893, Edinburgh and District Tramways took over the lines operated by the company within the Edinburgh city boundary. On 31 January 1896 they took over the line to Meadowbank. On 23 October 1904, Leith Corporation Tramways took over the lines operated by the company within the Leith town boundary, and Edinburgh Street Tramways ceased to trade.

Car 23 survives, owned by the Edinburgh Horse Tram Trust, and has been restored and is on display at the Scottish Vintage Bus Museum at Lathalmond.

References

Tram transport in Scotland
Transport in Edinburgh
Edinburgh Trams
History of Edinburgh